Mauricio Ávila (born 23 April 1973) is a Guatemalan boxer. He competed in the men's lightweight event at the 1992 Summer Olympics.

References

1973 births
Living people
Guatemalan male boxers
Olympic boxers of Guatemala
Boxers at the 1992 Summer Olympics
Place of birth missing (living people)
Lightweight boxers